Bonnesen's inequality is an inequality relating the length, the area, the radius of the incircle and the radius of the circumcircle of a Jordan curve.  It is a strengthening of the classical isoperimetric inequality.

More precisely, consider a planar simple closed curve of length  bounding a domain of area . Let  and  denote the radii of the incircle and the circumcircle.  Bonnesen proved the inequality

The term  in the right hand side is known as the isoperimetric defect.

Loewner's torus inequality with isosystolic defect is a systolic analogue of Bonnesen's inequality.

References

Geometric inequalities